Arindam Nanigopal Ghosh (born 19 October 1986) is an Indian cricketer who plays for Railways cricket team as a right-handed batsman. He was a member of the Kolkata Knight Riders squad in 2009 Indian Premier League.

Ghosh played for the India Under-19 cricket team during the 2005/06 season. From 2006/07 to 2011/12, he played for Bengal cricket team. He switched to Railways cricket team before the 2013/14 season. In October 2014, he played for Central Zone cricket team in the final of the 2014–15 Duleep Trophy.

He was the leading run-scorer for Railways in the 2017–18 Ranji Trophy, with 406 runs in six matches. He was also the leading run-scorer for Railways in the 2018–19 Vijay Hazare Trophy, with 246 runs in six matches.

References

External links 
 

1986 births
Living people
Indian cricketers
Bengal cricketers
Railways cricketers
Kolkata Knight Riders cricketers
Central Zone cricketers